Anders G. Högmark (born 29 October 1945) is a Swedish politician of the Moderate Party, member of the Riksdag 1979–2006.

References

Members of the Riksdag from the Moderate Party
Living people
1945 births
Members of the Riksdag 2002–2006
Place of birth missing (living people)
21st-century Swedish politicians